Ventseslav Stoyanov (born 18 February 1946) is a Bulgarian cross-country skier. He competed in the men's 15 kilometre event at the 1972 Winter Olympics.

References

1946 births
Living people
Bulgarian male cross-country skiers
Olympic cross-country skiers of Bulgaria
Cross-country skiers at the 1972 Winter Olympics
Place of birth missing (living people)